Dream Rovers  is a country music band in Tehran, Iran and introduced as the pioneer of country music in Iran.
The main members of the band are Erfan Rezayatbakhsh (elf) (singer/songwriter), and Ahmad Motevassel (lead guitar and recording engineer).

History

Persian Rovers
In January 2007 the band was formed under the name of "Persian Rovers" in Tehran by Erfan Rezayatbakhsh as the singer. The main activity of Persian Rovers was covering old songs. This procedure went on until Erfan came back from his military conscription in April 2007 and the band decided to start recording their original songs. With respect to this subject, they started working on the songs written by Erfan. In October that year Persian Rovers collapsed while they had only succeeded in preparing a demo for the song February Snow.

Dream Rovers
After the end of Persian Rovers, Erfan started recruiting by talking to Majid Sadeghi with whom he got acquainted years ago at university.
After recruiting the name of the band changed to Dream Rovers.

2008–present
In March 2008, when the band was working on the arrangement of "Cloudy Sky" Majid met Ahmad Motevasel, who was a self taught guitar player. Ahmad was attracted by the style and the songs of the band and agreed to join Dream Rovers when he was invited to.

New members
While completing the arrangement of Cloudy Sky a need for piano seemed to be obvious. Therefore, Erfan asked his blind friend, Parham Doustdar, to join the band, whose cooperation with the band lasted until the completion of their debut album, Off the Road. Afterwards, Parham left the band.

Innovations
Living in a non-American society and culture, along with members having different musical tastes have led to some innovations in their rendition of country music such as switching the style of the song from country to rock and sometimes switching back to country.

Instrumentalists
Honeyeh Rezayatbakhsh: Violin (elf's sister who usually cooperates with the band in studio as violinist and recording supervisor)
Makan Mahmoudi: Bass Guitar (has accompanied the band in their all concerts in SUT)
Mohammad Shojaie: Drums (has cooperated with the band in studio and 2011 SUT concert as the drummer)
Soheil Rezanejad: Piano (accompanied the band in second and third SUT concert as the pianist)
Omid Mazra'e : Drums (the 2012 SUT Concert drummer)
Parham Doustdar: ( Recording supervisor, Pianist in studio and first concert at SUT)
Majid Sadeghi: (Bass player of four songs in the band's debut album Off the Road)

Discography

Flashback Album

cover of songs from the 1970s and before|
Track listing: (as shown on the cover of the album)
               Don't Play Your Rock'n'Roll To Me……………  Mike Chapman (1975)
               Sixteen Tons…………………………………………….  Merle Travis (1946)
               Delilah……………………………………………………… Barry Mason (1968)
               Hungry Eyes……………………………………………….Merle Haggard (1969)
               Imagine……………………………………………………..John Lennon (1971)
               Mambo Italiano………………………………………….Bob Merrill (1954)

Off the Road Album
The debut album which includes the original songs of Dream Rovers.

Track listing

Live performance
Despite all of the restrictions placed on bands and artists who attempt to perform and play western music in Iran – a country notorious for forcing aspiring artists to toil underground in obscurity – Dream Rovers has managed to perform live on three occasions at Sharif University of Technology (SUT) between May 2011 and May 2012 in front of audiences of more than 500 people – an unheard of number under such a restrictive regime.

Singles

Dear Superstar
Dear Superstar is the first single of the band from the debut album, Off the Road, written by the vocalist, Erfan Rezayatbakhsh, in form of a letter to the country-pop superstar, Taylor Swift.
The Idea of the song was ignited when Erfan was watching a documentary about FGM (Female Genital Mutilation) and when he changed the channel there was a video of Taylor Swift in which she was at the same age of the FGM victims he was just watching.
According to him, he only wanted to remind Taylor that some of her fans have completely different lives than what she has. So, that would be a good idea for the superstar to sing about her living-in-misery fans sometimes.
The video of the song was directed by Ali T and shot in Tehran in the last day of 2011.

Without Even Saying Goodbye
A fusion of Persian traditional music and country music written by elf. This single was recorded in the Summer of 2014 in Melbourne, Florida. Ehsan Tootoonchi is the featuring artist in this track who accompanies elf with his Taar.

The Girl I Know
The first Single of Dream Rovers' third studio album. Which was recorded in Johnson City, Tennessee in 2014. The music video was also filmed and edited in Johnson City in November 2014 by Ryan Renfro.

I've Been Everywhere
The first bilingual song which is mostly in Persian. Was recorded and released in 2016.

2012 to 2016
In December 2012 Erfan (elf) moved to Johnson City, Tennessee to be the first Iranian student at East Tennessee State University's Bluegrass, Old Time and Country Music program. He was awarded Public Performance and Pulmer's scholarships and graduated summa cum laude on 13 December 2014 and became the first Iranian ever who graduated the program.
Erfan recorded one single while studying at ETSU named "The Girl I Know" and, shortly before his graduation in December 2014, he made the music video in Johnson City, Tennessee and moved to Canada on New Year's Eve 2015. The music video of The Girl I know was featured on Voice of America's "Top Ten" show on 5 May 2015.

References

Iranian country music groups
Musical groups from Tehran